"Martin" Cao Hong Wei (born 17 February 1993) is a Chinese racing driver.

Career

Asian championships
Born in Hunan, Cao started his racing career in 2008 in the Chinese Formula Ford Campus Championship. He won five races and clinched the championship with an advantage of seven points. Also in 2008, Cao finished third with seven podiums in the Asian Formula Renault Challenge and also contested two races of the Formula BMW Pacific Championship, with Pacific Racing.

In 2009, Cao remained in Formula BMW Pacific but switched to Ao's Racing. He had six point-scoring finishes in nine races, finishing twelfth in the championship.

In 2010, Cao returned to the Asian Formula Renault Challenge with the FRD Racing Team. He won five out of the six races he contested – one more than champion Sandy Stuvik – and finished fourth in the championship.

Protyre Formula Renault
In 2012, Cao moved to Europe and joined Fortec Motorsports to compete in Formula Renault BARC. He finished nine races in the points to take fourteenth position in the championship, with 100 points. He also finished fifth in the 2012 Formula Renault BARC Winter Series.

Cao remained with Fortec into 2013, staying in the newly renamed Protyre Formula Renault Championship. He won a race at Rockingham and finished fourth in the final championship standings. He finished runner-up to Ben Barnicoat in the Protyre Formula Renault Autumn Cup at Rockingham, winning one of the event's three races.

British Formula 3 Championship
Cao continued his collaboration with Fortec into the British Formula 3 Championship in 2014. He finished fifteen races on the podium, including four wins. He battled with his teammate Matt Rao for the title, and clinched the championship by just two points, ahead of Rao.

Racing record

Career summary

 As Cao was a guest driver, he was ineligible for points.
* Season still in progress.

Complete FIA Formula 3 European Championship results
(key)

Complete TCR International Series results
(key) (Races in bold indicate pole position) (Races in italics indicate fastest lap)

References

External links

1993 births
Living people
Chinese racing drivers
Sportspeople from Hunan
Formula BMW Pacific drivers
Formula Renault BARC drivers
British Formula Three Championship drivers
FIA Formula 3 European Championship drivers
Asian Formula Renault Challenge drivers
TCR International Series drivers
TCR Asia Series drivers
Eurasia Motorsport drivers
Fortec Motorsport drivers